The 2011 Tequila Patrón American Le Mans Series at Long Beach was held at Long Beach Street Circuit on April 16, 2011.  It was the second round of the 2011 American Le Mans Series season.

Qualifying

Qualifying Result
Pole position winners in each class are marked in bold.

Race

Race result
Class winners in bold.  Cars failing to complete 70% of their class winner's distance are marked as Not Classified (NC).

References

Long Beach
Grand Prix of Long Beach